Arleen or Arlene is an Irish feminine given name and variant of Carlene or Charlene and in the French derived from feminine diminutive of Charles (meaning free man).

Given name
Arleen Auger (1939–1993), American soprano, admired for her coloratura voice and interpretations of works by Bach, Handel, Haydn, Monteverdi, Gluck, and Mozart
Arleen Day (1949–2012), Canadian curler from Regina, Saskatchewan
Arleen Schloss (born 1943), artists from New York
Arleen Sorkin (born 1955), American actress
Arleen Whelan (1916–1993),  American film actress
Arlene Alda (born 1933), American musician, photographer, and writer
Arlene Anderson Skutch (1924–2012), singer, actress, and painter 
Arlene Arcillas (born 1969), city mayor of Santa Rosa, Laguna
Arlene Blencowe (born 1989),  mixed martial artist and boxer
Arlene Brosas (born 1976), Filipino educator, child rights activist, and politician
Arlene Chai (born 1955), Filipino-Chinese-Australian author
Arlene Dahl (1925–2021), American actress
Arlene Eisenberg (1934–2001), American author
Arlene Foster (born 1970), Northern Irish politician who has been a Member of the Legislative Assembly for Fermanagh and South Tyrone since 2003
Arlene Francis (1907–2001), American actress
Arlene Golonka (1936–2021), American actress
Arlene Harris (1896–1976), Canadian-born American radio, film, and television actress
Arlene Howell (born 1939), American television actress
Arlene Hutton, American playwright, theatre artist, and teacher
Arlene Klasky (born 1949), American artist
Arlene Martel (born 1936), American actress
Arlene Phillips (born 1943), professional dancer and theatre choreographer
Arlene Pieper, the first woman to officially finish a marathon in the United States, which occurred in 1959
Arlene Pileggi (born 1952), American actor
Arlene Sanford, American film and television director
Arlene Semeco (born 1984), freestyle swimmer
 Arlene The Housewife, a female wrestler from Gorgeous Ladies of Wrestling
Arlene Williams (1946–2017), TV host
Arlene Xavier (born 1969), volleyball player
Arline Burks Gant, director, actress, and costume designer
Arline Fisch (born 1931), American artist and educator
Arline Judge (1912–1972), American actress-singer
Arleene Johnson (1924–2017), Canadian former infielder who played from 1945 through 1948 in the All-American Girls Professional Baseball League

Fictional characters 
Arlene, a fictional character in Garfield
 Arlene Joseph, a character in the 1998 Canadian-American independent film Smoke Signals
Arlene, a fictional character in The X-Files

Other
"Arlene" (song), the 1985 debut single by American country music artist Marty Stuart

English-language feminine given names
Feminine given names